Münevver Andaç  (12 February 1917  16 May 1997) was a translator of Turkish literature. She was the partner of the poet Nazim Hikmet and had a son with him named Mehmet. She translated Hikmet's work into French, as she did for many other Turkish writers. She was also responsible for introducing Orhan Pamuk to the Francophone world. Pamuk has acknowledged Andaç's role in making his work available in French.

References

Turkish translators
1917 births
1998 deaths
Istanbul University Faculty of Law alumni